The second LG Cup is an exhibition association football tournament that took place in  Russia.

Participants
The participants were:

Results

Semifinals

Third place match

Final

Top scorers
2 goals
  Valyantsin Byalkevich 
1 goal
  Alyaksandr Hleb
  Darko Kovacevic
  Dmitriy Sychov
  Andrei Solomatin
  Serhiy Popov
  Volodymyr Musolitin

See also
LG Cup

References

International association football competitions hosted by Russia